The June 2000 Chechnya suicide bombings were Chechnya's first suicide attacks with car bombs.

On June 6, 2000, the 17-year-old Khava Barayeva (relative of Arbi Barayev), accompanied by 16-year-old Luiza Magomadova, drove a truck loaded with explosives through a checkpoint of an OMON base at Alkhan-Yurt in Chechnya. Barayeva detonated her bomb outside the barracks, killing a number of paramilitary police troops (rebels claimed up to 27 were killed, but the Russians claimed only two were killed and five were injured).

Another suicide bombing, which killed two OMON troops at a checkpoint leading to the Khankala base, was carried five days later on June 11 by a former Russian prisoner of war Sergey Dimitriyev who had converted to Islam and joined the rebels while in captivity.

Sources
Suicide Operations in Chechnya: An Escalation of the Islamist Struggle

External links
Suicide bombers strike in Chechnya, BBC News, 8 June 2000

Attacks in Russia in 2000
Explosions in 2000
2000 in Russia
Suicide bombing in the Chechen wars
Terrorist incidents in Russia in 2000
June 2000 events in Russia
2000 murders in Russia
20th-century mass murder in Russia
Attacks in Russia